is a Japanese mixed martial artist. He currently competes in the strawweight division of Pancrase, where he is the reigning Pancrase Strawweight champion.

Mixed martial arts career

Pancrase

Neo Blood Tournament
On December 12, 2020, it was announced that Yamakita would be one of eight participants in the 2020 Pancrase Neo Blood strawweight tournament. Yamakita faced the 0–2 Masaya Oshiro in the tournament quarterfinals, which were held at Pancrase 312 on February 16, 2020. He won the fight by a first-round technical submission by kimura.

Yamakita faced the debuting Tomoki Otsuka at Pancrase 319 on October 25, 2020, in the penultimate bout of the tournament. He won the fight by unanimous decision. Yamakita advanced to the tournament final, held at Pancrase 320 on December 13, 2020, where he faced the undefeated Taiga Tanimura. He won the fight by unanimous decision, with scores of 30–27, 29–28 and 29–28.

Title run
Yamakita faced Shuto Aki at Road to ONE: Young Guns on February 22, 2021. He won the fight by a second-round knockout. Yamakita took Aki down early on in the second round and finished him with grounded knees at the 2:21 minute mark.

Yamakita faced the sixth ranked Pancrase strawweight contender Tatsuki Ozaki at Pancrase 322 on June 27, 2021. He won the fight by a first-round submission, forcing Ozaki to tap with an armbar near the very end of the round.

Yamakita faced the once-defeated Ryosuke Noda at Pancrase 324 on October 16, 2021. He won the fight by unanimous decision. Two of the judges scored the fight 30–27 in his favor, while the third judge awarded him a 30–26 scorecard. Following this victory, Yamakita was ranked as the third best strawweight in the world by Fight Matrix.

Strawweight champion
His six-fight undefeated streak in Pancrase earned Yamakita a title opportunity, as he was booked to challenge the reigning Strawweight King of Pancrase Daichi Kitakata in the main event of the first part of Pancrase 328 on July 18, 2022. He captured the title by unanimous decision, with all three judges scoring the bout 48–47 in his favor.

ONE Championship
On February 10, 2023, Yamakita announced that he signed with ONE Championship.

Yamakita is scheduled to face Alex Silva on March 25, 2023, at ONE Fight Night 8.

Championships and accomplishments

Mixed martial arts
Pancrase
Amateur All Japan Pancrase Flyweight Championship
Pancrase Neo Blood Strawweight Tournament Winner
Pancrase Strawweight Championship

Grappling
Freestyle Wrestling
 2011 National Junior High School Championship	(−47 kg) Third Place
 2016 East Japan Student Autumn Newcomer Championship (−57 kg) Third Place
 2017 East Japan Student Spring Championship (−57 kg) Runner-up
 2017 National Sports Conference (−57 kg) Runner-up
 2018 East Japan Student Spring Championship (−57 kg) Third Place
 2018 East Japan Student Autumn Championship (−57 kg) Runner-up

Jiu-Jitsu
 2019 All Japan Nogi Jiu-Jitsu Light Featherweight Advanced Championship Runner-up
 2022 All Japan Nogi Jiu-Jitsu Light Featherweight Expert Championship Third Place
 2022 All Japan Brazilian Jiu-Jitsu Championship Blue Belt Light Featherweight Championship

Mixed martial arts record

 

|-
| Win
| align=center| 7–0
| Daichi Kitakata
| Decision (unanimous)
| Pancrase 328
| 
| align=center| 5
| align=center| 5:00
| Tokyo, Japan
| 
|-
| Win
| align=center| 6–0
| Ryosuke Noda
| Decision (unanimous)
| Pancrase 324
| 
| align=center| 3
| align=center| 5:00
| Tokyo, Japan
| 
|-
| Win
| align=center| 5–0
| Tatsuki Ozaki
| Submission (armbar)
| Pancrase 322
| 
| align=center| 1
| align=center| 4:54
| Tokyo, Japan
| 
|-
| Win
| align=center| 4–0
| Shuto Aki
| KO (knee)
| Road to ONE: Young Guns
| 
| align=center| 2
| align=center| 2:21
| Tokyo, Japan
| 
|-
| Win
| align=center| 3–0
| Taiga Tanimura
| Decision (unanimous)
| Pancrase 320
| 
| align=center| 3
| align=center| 5:00
| Tokyo, Japan
| 
|-
| Win
| align=center| 2–0
| Tomoki Otsuka
| Decision (unanimous)
| Pancrase 319
| 
| align=center| 3
| align=center| 5:00
| Tokyo, Japan
| 
|-
| Win
| align=center| 1–0
| Masaya Oshiro
| Technical submission (Kimura)
| Pancrase 312
| 
| align=center| 1
| align=center| 4:51
| Tokyo, Japan
| 
|-

See also
 List of current ONE fighters
 List of Pancrase champions

References

Living people
1996 births
Japanese male mixed martial artists
Strawweight mixed martial artists
Sportspeople from Mie Prefecture
Mixed martial artists utilizing wrestling
Mixed martial artists utilizing Brazilian jiu-jitsu
Japanese male sport wrestlers
Japanese practitioners of Brazilian jiu-jitsu